Stephen Wilhelm (19 April 1919, Imperial, California – 15 July 2002, Walnut Creek, California) was a professor of plant pathology, known for his success in controlling Verticillium wilt. His research on plant hybridization and soil fumigation contributed to revolutionary developments in the strawberry and raspberry industries.

Biography
Wilhelm matriculated in 1941 at the University of California, Los Angeles and graduated there with bachelor's degree in 1944. During WW II, he served in the U.S. Army. He received his Ph.D. in 1948 from the University of California, Berkeley (UC Berkeley). In 1949 he was an assistant professor of plant pathology and an assistant plant pathologist at the Experiment Station, Berkeley. Wilhelm remained on the faculty of UC Berkeley until he retired as professor emeritus. He was a Guggenheim Fellow for the academic year 1958–1959.

Stephen Wilhelm worked closely with California growers of strawberries, cotton, olives, bush berries, and raspberries, as well as other scientists working with these crops, and became known for his research on controlling Verticillium wilt. He was a pioneer of the use of chloropicrin and the introduction of multiple cultivars for controlling plant diseases. He studied all the aspects of microbiology related to maintaining a healthy rhizosphere.

Wilhelm was the author or co-author of over 300 scientific articles. For many years at Berkeley, he taught a course The Principles of Plant Pathology, emphasizing the history of particular plant diseases and contrasting past methods of control with present methods of control. Wilhelm and James E. Sagen wrote A History of the Strawberry from Ancient Gardens to Modern Markets (1974, University of California Press). After retiring from U.C. Berkeley as professor emeritus, Wilhelm became the chief raspberry breeder for the Sweet Briar Company, which later became a part of Driscoll Strawberries, Inc., now called Driscoll's, Inc.

Upon his death he was survived by his widow and two sons.

Selected publications

Patents

References

External links

1919 births
2002 deaths
American phytopathologists
University of California, Los Angeles alumni
University of California, Berkeley faculty
People from Imperial County, California
United States Army personnel of World War II
20th-century agronomists